Ahmad Gohari (born 12 January 1996) is an Iranian professional footballer who plays as a goalkeeper for Persian Gulf Pro League club Persepolis.

Club career

Pars Jonoubi Jam
He made his debut for Pars Jonoubi Jam in 29th fixtures of 2017–18 Iran Pro League against Naft Tehran.

Persepolis
On 2 February 2022, Gohari signed a 18-month contract with Persian Gulf Pro League champions Persepolis. Gohari has joined Persepolis as replacement of Božidar Radošević.

Club career statistics

International career

Iran Youth 
In 2013, he participated in the Iranian U-17 national team in the U-17 World Cup. Gohari also in the Iranian U-19 national team in the 2014 Asian U-19 Championship.

Honours
Persepolis
Iranian Super Cup Runner-Up (1): 2021

References

External links

 
 

1996 births
Living people
Iranian footballers
Pars Jonoubi Jam players
Association football goalkeepers
Persepolis F.C. players
Persian Gulf Pro League players
Saipa F.C. players
Naft Tehran F.C. players
Naft Masjed Soleyman F.C. players
Sanat Naft Abadan F.C. players